The BHP Newcastle 37 class were a class of diesel locomotives built by A Goninan & Co, Broadmeadow for the BHP, Newcastle steelworks between 1960 and 1983.

History

In 1960, the first five locomotives numbered 37 to 41 were delivered by A Goninan & Co to a design suitable for use on both the narrow gauge  ingot system and the  system. These locos were an Australian version of the standard General Electric 80 Ton switcher. Originally two of these five locomotives were fitted with narrow gauge bogies, the other three being fitted with standard gauge bogies. These locos were fitted with 2 Cummins NHS-B1-6 supercharged diesel engines. Whilst the first five were under construction an order for a further six locos to the same specifications was placed, these locos were given numbers 42 to 47.

In 1961, a further 6 locos were ordered from Goninans, these 6 however were powered by two Rolls-Royce C6TFL turbocharged diesel engines. These 6 locos were numbered 48 to 53.

The first 15 locos were swapped between the narrow and standard gauge networks by changing the bogies and couplers. However, by the mid-1960s, problems were experienced in working wide standard gauge rolling stock such as the Treadwell hot metal cars.

In 1966, a further loco was delivered from Goninans. Numbered 54, it was built with a wide body and fitted with 2 Cummins NHS-B1-6 supercharged engines. The next 2 locos were delivered in 1977 (55 and 56) and were fitted with Cummins NT855 turbocharged engines, the latter built to narrow gauge specifications. Both did not enter service when delivered and were placed in storage, 55 being placed in service in late 1979 and 56 in early 1980. The last 2 (57 and 58) were delivered in 1982, they were fitted with Cummins NT855 turbocharged engines.

In the 1980s, the Rolls-Royce powered locos and the older Cummins supercharged locos were placed into storage due to difficulties in obtaining spare parts. Later many of these were repowered with Cummins NT855 turbocharged engines, those locos which weren't re-engined were either scrapped or sold.

The introduction of a continuous bloom caster at the steelworks in 1987 saw the phasing out of the narrow gauge rail system with the system being closed in 1991 and the narrow gauge rolling stock and locos scrapped.

With the closure of steel making at Newcastle Steelworks on 30 September 1999 and with the remaining rail traffic being hauled by National Rail, the last 9 locos in service were placed into store and put up for sale. A number were sold to private buyers for use as shunters. Two were sold to the Manildra Group, two to Junee Railway Workshop, two to Loongana Lime and one to Heggies Bulk Haul, Port Kembla, the latter being resold to the Manildra Group. Two been preserved by the Dorrigo Steam Railway & Museum and four by the Richmond Vale Railway Museum.

Class list

Other buyers
The General Electric 80 Ton switcher locomotive design was used by other industrial manufacturing companies around New South Wales including Sulphide Corporation who purchased one in November 1964 for its Cockle Creek Smelter, Southern Portland Cement who purchased two in July 1967 for use at Marulan South and Berrima, and John Lysaght who purchased one for use at Port Kembla.

References

 
 
 
 Specification sheet ex BHP Newcastle Steelworks diesel shop

BHP Billiton diesel locomotives
Bo-Bo locomotives
General Electric locomotives
Diesel locomotives of New South Wales
Railway locomotives introduced in 1960
Rail transport in the Hunter Region
3 ft gauge locomotives
Standard gauge locomotives of Australia
Diesel-electric locomotives of Australia